Krasnooktyabrsky (Oktjabrəptlyź) is a rural locality (a settlement) and the administrative center of Krasnooktyabrskoye Rural Settlement of Maykopsky District, Russia. The population was 6536 as of 2018. There are 69 streets.

Geography 
Krasnooktyabrsky is located 14 km northwest of Tulsky (the district's administrative centre) by road. Prirechny is the nearest rural locality.

References 

Rural localities in Maykopsky District